The Chevrolet Astro is a van that was manufactured and marketed by the Chevrolet division of American auto manufacturer General Motors from 1985 to 2005. Sold alongside the GMC Safari, the Astro was marketed in multiple configurations, including passenger minivan and cargo van.

The Astro and Safari are GM M-body vehicles, using a rear-wheel drive chassis; all-wheel drive became an option in 1990. For its entire production, the Astro and Safari were produced by Baltimore Assembly in Baltimore, Maryland; the vans would be the final model line produced by the facility. In total, approximately 3.2 million Astros and Safaris were produced from 1985 to 2005.

Background
The Astro and Safari were introduced for 1985 as the first minivan from General Motors. While marketed as a response to the first-generation Chrysler minivans, GM selected a rear-wheel drive layout, sizing the Astro and Safari closely to the short-wheelbase Chevrolet G10 van.

Prior to its use on a minivan, the Astro nameplate was used twice by General Motors; in 1967 (for the Chevrolet Astro 1 concept car) and from 1969 to 1987 (on the GMC Astro COE semitractor). GMC sourced the Safari nameplate from Pontiac (used by the latter to denote station wagons). As GMC was half of the Pontiac/GMC Division (later including Buick), from 1985 to 1989, both GMC and Pontiac Safaris were simultaneously offered through the same dealership network.

First generation (1985–1994)

Initial advertising boasted that it was a vehicle that will "make you realize that life is too big for a minivan", referring to the Chrysler minivans. The van can have a seating configuration between two and eight passengers.

Engine choices ranged from a  2.5 L four-cylinder to a  4.3 L V6, depending on options and/or model year. The 4-cylinder engine was only offered in cargo versions of the Astro; it was dropped after 1990. For 1985, the 4.3l-V6 (RPO LB1) used a 4 barrel carburetor. For 1986 throttle body fuel injection (TBI) was used. For 1992 and later years, the central port injection was used.
Much like the second-generation GM-F body 1970-1981 and X-body vehicles, the GM M-van (Astro/Safari) had a bolt-on subframe. For the M-van, the front suspension shared most components with the GM B-body station wagon (Chevrolet Caprice, Oldsmobile Custom Cruiser and larger variants of the Pontiac Safari and Buick Estate Wagon) with a leaf-spring rear suspension. The lower ball joints were larger than their B-body counterparts (similar to 1977-96 Cadillac D platform vehicles, e.g., Fleetwood limousines). These ball joints were later used in the final Chevrolet Caprice 9C1 (police package) cars manufactured in 1995 and 1996. They also shared many mechanical similarities to the GMT 325/330 midsize S/T pickups and utility vehicles.

Digital dashboards were offered in the first generation Astro; this option did not continue after 1995.

1989 was the final year that the Borg Warner T-5 manual transmission was made available. All subsequent models were equipped with 700R4/4l60 automatic transmissions through 1993.
 
In 1990 a new all-wheel drive (AWD) system (the first U.S.-built minivan to do so), designed and developed by FF Developments (FFD), was made optional. The AWD models had a lower fuel economy: 17 miles per gallon highway versus 20 to 21 miles per gallon for rear-wheel drive vans. AWD Astros used a Borg Warner 4472 transfer case.

The 1990 model year also introduced a new analog dashboard and the hydroboost braking system, a system using the same accessory belt-driven pump to supply the power steering and brakes. In mid-1990 an extended body option, sharing its wheelbase with the shorter version, also became available.

In 1992, a new optional door form was introduced, colloquially known as Dutch doors. This form was two bi-parting doors with a flip-up window above. Previously, Astro and Safari vans were equipped only with bi-parting doors. An optional 4.3 L (RPO L35) engine with central port injection and a balance shaft was phased in.

In 1993, the electronically controlled 4L60E 4-speed automatic transmission with overdrive became standard as the sole transmission offering. As with many other 1993 model year GM vehicles, Scotchgard fabric protection also became a standard feature on Astro vans equipped with cloth seats. 1994 also saw the addition of three new exterior paint colors. These colors were Indigo Blue Metallic (#39), Light Quasar Blue Metallic (#20), and Medium Quasar Blue Metallic (#80).

For the 1994 model year, GM started manufacturing most of their vehicles, including the Astro and Safari, with CFC-free air-conditioning systems, which used R134a refrigerant instead of R-12 refrigerant.

Second generation (1995–2005)

 

In 1995, the model was facelifted with an extended nose that resembled the then-new full-size Express vans; while the original rectangular sealed beam headlights were retained for use on lower trim levels, higher spec models now used horizontally-mounted rectangular headlights that had debuted on the full-size trucks in 1988, and would eventually appear on the smaller trucks in 1995. Also for 1995, the shorter length body was dropped. In 1996, a redesigned dash received a passenger-side airbag. The vans remained mostly unchanged until the end of production in 2005.

In 2003, GM upgraded the chassis of both the Astro and Safari with certain suspension components, larger brakes, and six-lug, 16 inch wheels from the full-size Chevrolet and GMC half-ton pickup trucks.

The Chevrolet Astro and GMC Safari twins were originally scheduled to be discontinued after 2002, but they continued until 2005 because of good sales.

Safety and crash testing 
The Insurance Institute for Highway Safety (IIHS), gave the Astro a "Poor" rating in 1996 because of a display of structural failure in the institute's  crash test into a fixed, offset barrier. The underbody of the test van buckled, pitching both front seats forward and shoving the crash dummy into the dashboard and steering wheel, and resulting in a broken left leg, leading the institute to comment that "[t]he collapse of the occupant compartment left little survival space for the driver."

In testing performed by the National Highway Traffic Safety Administration (NHTSA), however, the Astro and Safari fared better, improving from a single-star rating in 1991 to a three-star (driver) and four-star (passenger) rating by 2000. In side impacts, the Astro and Safari both received the highest, five-star rating in every year that the test was administered.

In 2007, the IIHS reported that the 2001–2004 model year Chevrolet Astro recorded during calendar years 2002–2005 the fewest killed drivers of all passenger vehicles in the United States, as calculated per every million units on the road. Driver's habits and vehicle usage might have influenced this result.

References

External links
1985 Chevrolet Astro handbook
1986 Chevrolet Astro handbook
1987 Chevrolet Astro handbook
1988 Chevrolet Astro handbook
1989 Chevrolet Astro handbook
1990 Chevrolet Astro handbook
1991 Chevrolet Astro handbook
1992 Chevrolet Astro handbook
1993 Chevrolet Astro handbook
1994 Chevrolet Astro handbook
1995 Chevrolet Astro handbook
1996 Chevrolet Astro handbook
1997 Chevrolet Astro handbook
1998 Chevrolet Astro handbook
1999 Chevrolet Astro handbook
2000 Chevrolet Astro handbook
2001 Chevrolet Astro handbook
2002 Chevrolet Astro handbook
2003 Chevrolet Astro handbook
2004 Chevrolet Astro handbook
2005 Chevrolet Astro handbook

Astro
All-wheel-drive vehicles
Rear-wheel-drive vehicles
Vans
Minivans
1990s cars
2000s cars
Cars introduced in 1985
Motor vehicles manufactured in the United States
Cars discontinued in 2005